Bille August  (born 9 November 1948) is a Danish director, screenwriter, and cinematographer of film and television. In a career spanning over four decades, he has been the recipient of numerous accolades, making him one of the most acclaimed contemporary Danish filmmakers.

August's 1987 film Pelle the Conqueror won the Palme d'Or, Academy Award and Golden Globe Award. He is one of only nine directors to win the Palme d'Or twice, winning the award again in 1992 for The Best Intentions, based on the autobiographical script by Ingmar Bergman.

His filmography includes The House of the Spirits, based on the novel by Isabel Allende; Smilla's Sense of Snow; Les Misérables; Night Train to Lisbon, Silent Heart, The Chinese Widow and A Fortunate Man. He has received five Robert Awards (including Best Film and Best Director) and three Bodil Awards for Best Danish Film. He is also a Knight of the Order of the Dannebrog.

Life and career 
August was born on 9 November 1948, in Brede, Denmark. After attending local schools, he graduated from the Foto- og Dokumentarskolan in Stockholm, Sweden, and later from the National Film School of Denmark. He began his career as a cinematographer. He made his feature directorial debut in 1978 with In My Life, which won the Bodil Award for Best Danish Film.

He collaborated twice with then wife Pernilla August under George Lucas on The Adventures of Young Indiana Jones in The Perils of Cupid and Tales of Innocence. Pernilla would later star in the first two films of the Star Wars prequel trilogy and appeared in an episode of The Clone Wars television series to reprise her role from the films.

After decades of writing, directing and producing notable films in Denmark, on 23 September 2011, Bille August announced that he had opened a studio in Hangzhou, China and taken a position as Tianpeng Media's Art Director, in order to produce Chinese films for Tianpeng Media over the next few years. Tianpeng Media is a new media company established in 2010. The company produced two films, The Women Knight of Mirror (竞雄女侠秋瑾) and The Years of Qi Xiao Fu (七小福之燃情岁月), to be released later in 2011. He is the first foreign director to be hired by the Chinese film company. In 2011 August also accepted the invitation from the Hangzhou government to serve as a "culture consultant" for the city.

His film Night Train to Lisbon (2013) premiered out of competition at the 63rd Berlin International Film Festival. He had planned to direct a Gianni Versace biopic with Antonio Banderas as Versace, but this project was cancelled. In August 2021, it was announced that August would direct a feature film adaptation of Karen Blixen's novel Ehrengard, which is being produced by Netflix and SF Studios.

Personal life 

August has been married four times and has a total of eight children with five different women.

He was first married to Annie Munksgård Lauritzen, together they had a son Anders Frithiof August (born 15 June 1978). His second wife was Masja Dessau with whom he had a son Adam August (born in 1983), both sons have become screenwriters. His third marriage to Swedish actress Pernilla August was from 1991 to 1997. Together they had daughters Asta Kamma August (born 5 November 1991) and Alba Adèle August (born 6 June 1993); he also became the stepfather of her daughter Agnes from her first marriage to Swedish novelist and screenwriter Klas Östergren. In 2012, he married his fourth and current wife, actress Sara-Marie Maltha after 10 years together. Together they have three children: Amaryllis April August (born 2003), Albert Amadeus August (born 2005), and Aya Anemone August (born 2013).

In addition, he has a daughter from a previous relationship, Melina August, (born in 1969).

Filmography

Film

As cinematographer

Television

References

External links
 1997 interview with Bille August about Smilla's Sense of Snow
 
 
 
 

1948 births
Living people
People from Lyngby-Taarbæk Municipality
Danish film directors
Danish male screenwriters
Danish cinematographers
Directors of Palme d'Or winners
Directors of Best Foreign Language Film Academy Award winners
Knights of the Order of the Dannebrog